The International Sports Hall of Fame (ISHOF) is a section 501(c)(3)  Nonprofit organization established in 2012 by Dr. Robert M. Goldman to honor the world's greatest athlete legends in all categories of sports.

The ISHOF's mission is to inspire future generations of athletes by honoring the sports heroes of today.

Nominations

Potential Induction Candidates are selected on their past and present contributions to the sports world and their charitable works mentoring youth and inspiring future generations of athletes with a "giving back" mindset.

Induction ceremonies

The Hall of Fame Induction ceremonies are held annually at the world's largest sports festival, the Arnold Schwarzenegger Sports Festival, first weekend of March hosting 200,000 attendees and over 22,000 competing athletes in over 80 sports. As of 2023, 68 distinguished individuals have been inducted to the International Sports Hall of Fame.

Inductees

Class of 2012
 Arnold Schwarzenegger - 7 x Mr. Olympia, 5 x Mr. Universe, Actor, former Governor
 James J. Lorimer - Co-Founder of Arnold Sports Festival
 Jack LaLanne and Elaine LaLanne - Fitness and nutrition icons/ motivational speakers
 Randy Couture - 6 x UFC World Champion 
 Corey Everson - 6 x Ms. Olympia
 Mark Henry - Arnold Strongman Classic champion, WWE & Powerlifting Champion

Class of 2013
 Bruno Sammartino - World Wrestling Federation Champion  WWE Hall of Famer
 Franco Columbu - 2 x Mr. Olympia
 Archie Griffin - 2 x Heisman Trophy Winner
 Earl 'The Pearl' Monroe - NBA Hall of Famer
 Blaine Crew Wilson - 5 x Gymnastics National Champion

Class of 2014
 Joe Weider, Ben Weider and Betty Weider - Founders and Bodybuilding Pioneers, Fitness Magazines Publishers
 Lee Haney - 8 x Mr. Olympia
 Jason Statham - Martial Artist/ Movie Star, British Olympic Diving Team
 Cynthia Rothrock - 5 x Martial Arts World Champion
 Dan Gable - Olympic Gold Medalist, Team Olympic, World Coach: Wrestling

Class of 2015
 Evander Holyfield - 4 x Heavyweight Boxing Champion
 Ed Coan - Powerlifting Champion, 70 World Records
 Paul 'Triple H' Levesque - WWE Champion/ Sport Administrator
 Lenda Murray - 8 x Ms. Olympia
 Don 'The Dragon' Wilson - 11 x World Kick Boxing Champion
 Michael Jai White - Movie Star, Holder of 8 Karate Black Belts

Class of 2016
 Ronnie Coleman - 8 x Mr. Olympia
 Kurt Angle - Olympic Gold Medalist Wrestling/ WWE Champion
 Royce Gracie - 1st UFC Champion
 Johnny Bench - Hall of Fame Baseball Catcher
 AnnMaria De Mars - 1st American World Judo Champion

Class of 2017
 Lou Ferrigno - Mr. Universe, Movie-TV Actor
 Bill Kazmaier - 3 x World's Strongest Man, 2 x World Powerlifting Champion
 Herschel Walker - Heisman Trophy & College Football Hall of Famer
 Dr. Thomas Rosandich - Founder U.S. Sports Academy 
 Apolo Ohno - Olympic Speed Skating Champion

Class of 2018
 Dr. Terry Todd and Dr. Jan Todd - World Champion Powerlifters, Authors/ Publishers
 Bas Rutten - UFC World Champion, King of Pancrase Japanese MMA, Actor
 Ronda Rousey - UFC Women's Champion, Olympic Judo Medalist
 Phil Keoghan - Sports Documentarian

Class of 2019
 Benny 'The Jet' Urquidez - 5 x World Kick Boxing Champion
 Rocky Bleier - 4 x Super Bowl Winner: Pittsburgh Steelers
 Tim Kennedy - Soldier, MMA Fighter, TV actor
 Michael Buffer - Renowned Ring Announcer
 David Goggins - Guinness World record holder, Soldier, Ultra Marathon Champion

Class of 2020
 Lesley Visser - National Football League sportscaster, first female NFL analyst 
 Johnny Damon - Major League Baseball player
 Kirstie Ennis - Outdoor climber amputee, former US Marine Corps Sergeant, public speaker
 Forrest Griffin - UFC Champion and Hall of Famer
 Eddie George - National Football League player

Class of 2021
 Jay Cutler - 4 x Mr. Olympia
 Ernie Reyes Sr. - Martial artist, Actor and fight choreographer
 Billy Blanks - Martial artist, creator of the Tae Bo exercise program
 Marcus Allen - National Football League player
 Peter Westbrook - Sabre Fencing champion
 Stephanie McMahon - WWE executive

Class of 2022
 Ron Van Clief - Martial artist and actor 
 HRH Prince Gharios - Martial artist
 Shannon Knapp - Martial artist, Women's MMA Pioneer
 Stipe Miocic - UFC fighter
 Vinny Paz - Lightweight and light middleweight Boxing champion
 Frank Shamrock - UFC fighter, 4 x undefeated middleweight champion
 Burt Watson - Manager and sports promoter

Class of 2023 
 Hafþór Júlíus Björnsson - 30 x Strongman world champion, multiple world record holder and the Strongest man in history 
 Jackie Joyner-Kersee - 6 x Olympic medalist, Heptathlon world record holder
 Kayla Harrison - 2 x Olympic Judo gold medalist, 2 x women’s MMA champion
 Richard Sorin - Legend of grip strength, founder of Sorinex exercise equipment
 Ronnie Lott - 4 x NFL superbowl champion, pro Football hall of famer

Advisory board

Global Advisory Board

  Fairfax Hackley: Senior V.P./ISHOF
 Arnold Schwarzenegger -7 Time Mr. Olympia
 Dr. Joseph Maroon - Team Neurosurgeon-NFL Pittsburgh Steelers
 Dr Nick DiNubulie - Former Team Orthopedic Consultant-NBA Philadelphia 76ers
 Prof Dr. Eduardo DeRose - International Olympic Committee Medical Commission
 Randy Couture - UFC World Champion
 Earl 'The Pearl' Monroe - NBA Hall of Fame
 Mark Henry - World's Strongest Man/WWE World Champion
 Thomas P. Rosandich - Founder- U.S Sports Academy
 Dr Thomas Allen - Clinical Professor Center for Exercise and Sports Medicine University of Oklahoma School of Community Medicine
 Alan Goldberg - Founder - Action Martial Arts Magazine
 Rob Fletcher - America's Next Great Trainer
 James Lorimer - Co-Founder Arnold Schwarzenegger Sports Festival
 Dan O'Malley - Professional Boxer/Wrestler
 James Manion - President IFBB Pro League 
 Dr. James Stoxen - Team Doctors
 Dr Rafael Santonja - President IFBB
 Min Zhu - Deputy Chairman-China Collection Sports Committee
 Dr Ronald Klatz - Co-Founder-National Academy of Sports Medicine (NASM)
 David P. Webster - Strong Man Competition Official 
 Rick Collins: Attorney

References

External links
 

All-sports halls of fame
State sports halls of fame in the United States
Non-profit organizations based in Chicago
501(c)(3) organizations
Awards established in 2012
Sports organizations established in 2012
Sports hall of fame inductees